The Iglesia de la Encarnación (Church of the Incarnation) is a church in Marbella, southern Spain. It was built in the 16th and 17th century.

References
Official website

Encarnacion
Buildings and structures in Marbella
17th-century Roman Catholic church buildings in Spain
Baroque architecture in Andalusia